Choereae or Choireai was a town in ancient Euboea, in the territory of Eretria. It was a deme of Eretria. During the Greco-Persian Wars, it was a landing spot of the Persians in 490 BCE in their attack on Eretria.

References

Populated places in ancient Euboea
Former populated places in Greece
Lost ancient cities and towns